The Complete Index to World Film (citwf or  citwf.com) is an online database of information related to movies. Citwf, compiled online by Alan Goble and Valan Publishing since 2004, had a Guinness Record as the world's largest published film-related database, with over 756,000 title entries.

In 1990, The Complete Index to World Film Since 1895  was published by Bowker Saur in two volumes. and a CD version was published in 1995.

Overview
The Complete Index to World Film since 1895 contains information on over 518,639 films produced in over 175 countries of the world between 1888 and 2019 and is accessible by all. A subscription version is available to libraries and institutions and this version contains no advertising and the additional benefit of over 580,284 references to books and journals.

See also
Allmovie
Internet Movie Database

References

External links
 

British film websites
Entertainment Internet forums
Online film databases
Internet properties established in 2004